Pamela Brown (December 31, 1924 – 1989) was a British novelist, stage writer, actress and television producer.

Literary career
Pamela Brown was just 13 when she started writing her first book, The Swish of the Curtain, in 1938. A year later, when World War II  broke out, she left Colchester County High School, a selective grammar school for girls, and went to live in Wales with her family. She continued with her writing however, sending chapters of the book to her friends back in Colchester, Essex, and finally finished the book when she was 16.

The Swish of the Curtain tells the story of seven stage-struck children who form an amateur theatre company in a town called Fenchester, Brown's made-up name for her home town of Colchester. She herself was passionate about the theatre and, from an early age, put on plays with her friends. She went on to write several sequels to her first book, and other children’s novels. Her career as an actress and television producer provided her with much detail about early television and life in repertory.

Stage career
With her earnings from The Swish of the Curtain, Brown trained as an actress at the Royal Academy of Dramatic Art. She worked on the professional stage as ‘Mela Brown’, to avoid confusion with another actress of the same name.

Television career
For some years, Pamela Brown produced children's programmes for BBC television. One of her final television appearances was as a guest on Blue Peter alongside the various young actors and actresses who appeared in the television adaptation of The Swish of the Curtain, including Sarah Greene, who was later to be a Blue Peter presenter.

Works
The Swish of the Curtain (1941) novel
Maddy Alone (1945) novel
Golden Pavements (1947) novel
Blue Door Venture (1949) novel
The Children of Camp Fortuna (1949) A play in one act for children
To be a Ballerina, and other stories (1950) short story collection
Family Playbill (1951) novel
The Television Twins (1952) novel
Harlequin Corner (1953) novel
The Windmill Family (1954) novel
Louisa (1955) novel
The Bridesmaids (1956) novel
Maddy Again (1956) novel
Back-Stage Portrait (1957)
Showboat Summer (1957) novel
Understudy (1958)
As far as Singapore (1959) novel
First House (1959) novel
A Little Universe (1970) novel
Summer is a Festival (1972) novel
Looking after Libby (1974) novel
The Girl who Ran Away (1976) novel
Every Day is Market Day (1977) novel
The Finishing School (1984) novel

References

External links
 

British children's writers
British women short story writers
1924 births
1989 deaths
Place of birth missing
Place of death missing
People educated at Colchester County High School
20th-century British novelists
20th-century British short story writers
British women children's writers
20th-century British women writers